Donald Ralph "Big Mac" MacSweyn (September 8, 1942 – May 21, 1995) was a Canadian professional ice hockey defenceman who played five seasons in the National Hockey League (NHL) for the Philadelphia Flyers. He also played two seasons in the World Hockey Association (WHA) with the Los Angeles Sharks and Vancouver Blazers.

Playing career
A native of Laggan, Ontario, MacSweyn played for teams in the NHL, EHL, WHL, AHL, WHA, SHL, NAHL, SLSHL, and the OIHA hockey leagues.

MacSweyn played for the following teams:
Lancaster Dodgers from 1963 to 1964
Johnstown Jets from 1964 to 1967 and 1976 to 1977
Portland Buckaroos from 1966 to 1967
Philadelphia Flyers from 1967 to 1972
Richmond Robins from 1971 to 1972 and 1974 to 1975
Los Angeles Sharks from 1972 to 1974
Vancouver Blazers from 1973 to 1974
Baltimore Clippers from 1975 to 1976
Richmond Wildcats from 1976 to 1977
Embrun Panthers from 1977 to 1978

MacSweyn was a member of the EHL North First All-Star Team in 1967, member of the AHL First All-Star Team in 1971, and a member of the AHL Second All-Star Team in 1972.

Later life and death
MacSweyn officially retired from playing hockey in 1977. After his retirement, MacSweyn returned to his family farm and also was involved in coaching his daughter's hockey team. In 1993 MacSweyn was inducted into the Glengarry Sports Hall of Fame in Glengarry, Ontario. On May 21, 1995, MacSweyn died in Glengarry, Ontario, at the age of 52. He was survived by his wife and two daughters.

External links
 

1942 births
1995 deaths
Baltimore Clippers players
Vancouver Blazers players
Canadian ice hockey defencemen
Ice hockey people from Ontario
Johnstown Jets players
Los Angeles Sharks players
Philadelphia Flyers players
Portland Buckaroos players
Quebec Aces (AHL) players
Richmond Robins players
People from Hawkesbury, Ontario
Richmond Wildcats players
Canadian expatriate ice hockey players in the United States